This is a list of notable longest-running video game franchises. To qualify for this list, a video game franchise must have seen regular releases, with no more than 10 year-long gaps in-between, for at least 25 years, from a franchise's first release to its most recent. Only franchises that started out as a video game are listed; therefore, licensed video games and video games based upon other media are not listed. Ports, translations, downloadable content, re-releases, and compilations are not considered new entries. Remakes (i.e., games with significant differences in graphics or game play or some new features) and expansion sets which received retail releases are considered new entries in a series.

Titles

Notes

See also
List of best-selling video game franchises
List of best-selling video games
List of video game franchises
History of video games

longest
Longest-running video game
Franchises